Christian Petzold (1677 – 1733) was a German composer and organist. He was active primarily in Dresden, and achieved a high reputation during his lifetime, but his surviving works are few. It was established in the 1970s that the famous Minuet in G major, previously attributed to Johann Sebastian Bach, was in fact the work of Petzold. The sprightly melody was used in the 1965 pop music hit "A Lover's Concerto" by the American group The Toys.

Life
He was born in Weißig near Königstein in 1677; the exact date of birth is unknown.

From 1703 Petzold worked as an organist at St. Sophia (Sophienkirche) in Dresden, and in 1709 he became court chamber composer and organist. He led an active musical life, giving concert tours that took him as far as Paris (1714) and Venice (1716). In 1720 he wrote a piece for the consecration of the new Silbermann organ at St. Sophia, and he performed a similar task at Rötha, near Leipzig, where another Silbermann organ was built. Petzold was also active as a teacher. His pupils included Carl Heinrich Graun.

Petzold died on 25 May 1733 and was buried three days later. His cause of death was recorded in the Dresden Kirchenwochenzettel as "Steckfluß" (choking rheum). The exact date of Petzold's death was given by the Dresden court musician Johann Samuel Kaÿser, who on 27 May 1733 petitioned for Petzold's position as organist in the St. Sophia. As is well known, Wilhelm Friedemann Bach was appointed in Petzold's place, while the Italian composer Giovanni Alberto Ristori became the court organist.

Legacy
Contemporaries held Petzold in high regard. Johann Mattheson and Ernst Ludwig Gerber both praised his skills, referring to him as "one of the most famous organists" and "one of the most pleasant church composers of the time", respectively. However, only a few of Petzold's pieces are extant today. He is best remembered for a pair of minuets that were copied into the 1725 Notebook for Anna Magdalena Bach, compiled by Anna Magdalena Bach and her husband Johann Sebastian Bach. One of these minuets, the Minuet in G major, achieved wide recognition, but for centuries was attributed to Johann Sebastian Bach. Petzold's authorship was only established in the 1970s.

Petzold always signed his name as Pezold.

Selected works

Vocal
 Cantata Meine Seufzer, meine Klagen

Ensemble
 Three trio sonatas

Solo instrumental
 Minuets in G major and G minor
 Two partitas for solo viola d'amore
 Recueil de 25 concerts pour le clavecin (1729), 25 harpsichord solo concertos 
 Orgeltabulatur (1704), chorale settings for organ
 11 fugues for organ or harpsichord
 A suite and single pieces for harpsichord

Notes

References

External links

 

1677 births
1733 deaths
People from Königstein, Saxony
17th-century classical composers
17th-century German people
18th-century classical composers
18th-century German people
German classical organists
German male organists
German male classical composers
German Baroque composers
Articles containing video clips
18th-century keyboardists
17th-century German musicians
18th-century German composers
18th-century German male musicians
17th-century male musicians
Male classical organists